Mount Larsen is a mountain,  high, presenting sheer granite cliffs on the north side and standing  southwest of Hansen Nunatak at the south side of the mouth of Reeves Glacier in Victoria Land, Antarctica. It was discovered by the British National Antarctic Expedition (1901–04) under Robert Falcon Scott, who named it for Captain C.A. Larsen, a noted Norwegian Antarctic explorer whose explorations along the east coast of the Antarctic Peninsula in the Jason, 1892–93, marked the beginning of commercial whaling operations in the Antarctic. Larsen led numerous whaling expeditions until his death in December 1925 while directing operations in the Ross Sea.

References

Mountains of Victoria Land
Scott Coast